Ibis Dam is a dam built in 1906 on Ibis Creek that serves as a water supply for the town of Irvinebank, Far North Queensland, Australia. Established by John Moffat, a mining entrepreneur, its construction was supervised by Tom Brodie, a Scottish stonemason.

A structural investigation was initiated in 2010 on behalf of its owner, the State Government of Queensland by the Department of Environment and Resource Management. This investigation uncovered significant structural concerns with the dam after many long-held assumptions about its initial construction were found to be untrue. After 12 months of negotiations at State level, a proposal was submitted to Tablelands Regional Council to take on ownership of the dam subsequent to a State-funded upgrade. The State's alternative to this option was to decommission the dam. In January 2012 Tablelands Regional Council decided to take on ownership of the Dam and the State began preparations for its upgrade. As of December 2012 upgrade works are ongoing

See also

List of dams and reservoirs in Australia

References

Reservoirs in Queensland
Buildings and structures in Far North Queensland
Dams completed in 1906
Dams in Queensland
1906 establishments in Australia